The 2015 NCAA Division II Football Championship Game was a postseason college football game that determined a national champion in NCAA Division II for the 2015 season. It was played at Children's Mercy Park in Kansas City, Kansas, on December 19, 2015, with kickoff at 3:00 p.m. EST (2:00 p.m. local CST), and television coverage on ESPN2.

Teams
The participants of the 2015 NCAA Division II Football Championship Game were the finalists of the 2015 Division II Playoffs, which began with four 7-team brackets to determine super region champions, who then qualified for the national semifinals. The game featured the winners of those national semifinal games: No. 1 seed Shepherd and No. 1 seed Northwest Missouri State. This was the first meeting between the teams. This was the Bearcats' ninth championship game appearance, having won 4, while the Rams were making their first appearance.

National semifinals

Game summary

Statistics

References

Championship Game
NCAA Division II Football Championship Games
Northwest Missouri State Bearcats football games
Shepherd Rams football games
American football in Kansas
NCAA Division II Football Championship Game
NCAA Division II Football Championship Game